Vermiceras is an ammonite that belongs to the order Ammonitida. Its shell is evolute and is covered in nonbranching ribs. Its whorls do not increase in size very fast, but there are many revolutions on its shell, which is fairly narrow. It has a sharp ventral keel and a diameter of about 5.2 centimeters (2 inches). It lived in the Early Jurassic.

Subgenera and species
 V. (=Metophioceras) galaczi
 V. (=Metophioceras) rotarium
 V. (=Metophioceras) rotticus
 V. (=Metophioceras) trigonatum
 V. (=Protocymbites) azzouzi
 V. densicostatum
 V. (Gyrophioceras)
 V. (G.) mineralense
 V. (G.) morganense
 V. (G.) praespiratissimum
 V. (G.) supraspiratum
 V. (Paracaloceras)
 V. (P.) concavum
 V. (P.) coregonense
 V. (P.) multicostatum 
 V. (P.) rursicostatum
 V. (P.) varaense

References
Notes

Bibliography
 Moore, Raymond Cecil., Alfred George. Fischer, and Cecil Gordon. Lalicker. Invertebrate Fossils. New York: McGraw-Hill, 1952. Print. 

Ammonitida genera
Early Jurassic ammonites
Arietitidae